Mondawmin is a neighborhood located in the city of Baltimore, Maryland, United States. The neighborhood is surrounded by Druid Hill Park, the Whitelock Community, and Lower Park Heights. Included within its boundaries are Frederick Douglass High School, and Mondawmin Mall. The Baltimore Metro Subway serves the neighborhood, with a station at Mondawmin Mall that is also a hub for many bus routes.

Location
The neighborhood is bounded by Longwood Street and Hilton Parkway to the west, Liberty Heights Avenue and Druid Park Drive to the north, Druid Hill Park and Fulton Avenue to the east, and North Avenue to the south. It occupies part or all of the zip codes 21215, 21216, and 21217.

Description
Mondawmin is perhaps the most diverse square mile in Baltimore in terms of social class. It is a historically African American community composed of young professionals, retirees, and working people, where each block has its own character. Some streets are lined with trees and marble steps, front porches and gardens. The neighborhood clusters around Mondawmin Mall, an urban shopping mall, and features schools ranging from elementary to four-year college, green space on wide boulevards and small streets, convenient small businesses, many active churches and dedicated neighborhood associations. Mondawmin is a community rich in character and history.

Highlights

Mondawmin Mall, a  shopping center featuring a full-service grocery store, and over 100 stores and shops
Mondawmin Transit Hub: The second-largest transit hub in Baltimore City, with access to Metro Subway and more than nine bus routes
Easterwood Park and Recreation Center
Hanlon Park
Parkwood Recreation Center
Bon Secours Liberty Village, a comprehensive health care center with residential complex for senior citizens

Within walking distance is Druid Hill Park, which includes basketball and tennis courts; Druid Hill Conservatory and the Maryland Zoo; and The Avenue (formerly Lafayette) Market.

Nearby professional and college institutions include Urban Medical Institute, Coppin State University, and one of two campuses of Baltimore City Community College. The neighborhood is five minutes by car from the nearest light rail station; the area is also served by the Maryland Transit Administration's Mondawmin Shuttle Bug bus. It is exploring a more comprehensive regional shuttle system.

Housing stock
Most of the neighborhood's residential areas consist of brick rowhouses. Those built before World War II have large front porches and in some cases Victorian styling. Those built after the war tend to be two-story brick structures on wider lots than generally found in the inner city. A few single dwellings near the Walbrook neighborhood reflect their origins as summer homes built in the early 20th century.

History
The area was estate countryside in the 19th century, characterized by large homes built by prominent city residents on the hilly countryside several hundred feet above the Inner Harbor area. Mondawmin takes its name from the estate owned by Dr. Patrick Macaulay (1795–1849), physician, city councilman, B&O Railroad director and patron of the arts. Tradition relates that Henry Wadsworth Longfellow visited Dr. Macaulay, who asked him what to name his home, then surrounded by corn fields. The poet allegedly looked around and replied, "Why not Mondamin, after the Indian corn god?" (Mapmakers later added a "w" to the name, and it stuck.)

The area known as Southern Mondawmin prides itself on a long history of stable homeownership. Many residents moved into the community in the late forties and early fifties as the area developed as the cultural and education center for African Americans. Robert W. Coleman, one of the community's renowned residents, established the first school for the blind for African Americans, at a time when public facilities and schools were segregated. Because of those early pioneers and the stability of the community, Southern Mondawmin was never designated as an urban renewal area.

While the community has changed over the past 15 years, residents, churches, businesses, and community associations are diligently working to return the area to its early luster. Recently, Southern Mondawmin was chosen by Baltimore city's government as one of six Healthy Neighborhoods. Parts of the community are included as part of the empowerment zone. Mondawmin still has many blighted areas.

Schools

Coppin State University
Baltimore City Community College
Frederick Douglass High School
William H. Lemmel Middle School
Gwynns Falls Elementary
Robert W. Coleman Elementary
William S. Baer Elementary
Mathew Henson Elementary School
Carver High School
Walbrook High School
George G. Kelson Elementary/Middle School
Westside Elementary School

Students living in Mondawmin can also attend Baltimore City's elite public high schools, such as the nearby Western High School and Baltimore Polytechnic Institute.

Library Branch
Enoch Pratt Free Library - Penn North

External links
Healthy Neighborhoods: Mondawmin
Mondawmin Mall
Coppin State University
Baltimore City Community College

 
Neighborhoods in Baltimore